Ahmed Abdou Abd El-Aziz El-Kass (Egyptian Arabic: أحمد الكاس; born 8 July 1965), is an Egyptian football manager and former football player.

Career
El-Kass played for Olympic, Zamalek and Ittihad Alexandria in the Egyptian Premier League. He is the league's fifth all-time highest scorer with 107 goals.

Clubs
Olympic (Alexandria) (1983–95) (78 gls)
Zamalek (1995–97) (33 gls)
Ittihad Allexandria (1998-2000) (4 gls)

National teams
Played for Egyptian National Team (1987–1997) / Captain in 1996
Played in World Cup 1990 in Italy
3 goals in African Cup Of Nations (South Africa 1996)

Titles
Personal
Egyptian League Top scorer for 3 successive years: 91/92,92/93&93/94.
Scored 107 Goals in Egyptian League
Scored 5 goals for Zamalek in African Club Cups

For National Teams
1 title of Arab Cup of Nations 1992
World Cup Champion for Military Egyptian team 1993
For Zamalek
CAF champions league: 1996
CAF Super cup : 1997

See also
 List of men's footballers with 100 or more international caps

References

External links

Ahmed El-Kass at Footballdatabase

1965 births
Living people
Zamalek SC players
Olympic Club (Egypt) players
Egyptian footballers
Egypt international footballers
Egyptian football managers
Al Ittihad Alexandria Club players
1990 FIFA World Cup players
1992 African Cup of Nations players
1994 African Cup of Nations players
1996 African Cup of Nations players
FIFA Century Club
Sportspeople from Alexandria
Egyptian Premier League players
Association football forwards